Miss Costa Rica 2019 was the 65th edition of Miss Costa Rica and was held on July 19, 2019, at the Marco Picado Studio. Natalia Carvajal of Escazú crowned Paola Chacón at the end of the event.

Results

Judges 
Mario Montenegro — national entrepreneur.
Luis Kaver — renowned national dentist.
Carolina Rodríguez — Miss Costa Rica 2016
Karla Blanco — renowned writer
Ana Gutiérrez — Costa Rican designer.

Delegates 
9 delegates confirmed.

Notes

Disqualifications 
 Paula Mendieta Siles: Paula was disqualified due to which she turned 29 in January, the organization only allows delegates from age 19–28.

Crossovers 
Delegates that competed or will be competing in other beauty pageants:

Miss Continents Unidos:
Brenda Muñoz Hernández

Miss International Queen of Nature:
Amanda Agüero Peralta

Miss Summer:
Chonta Mullins Abegglen
Evelyn Sibaja Alfaro

Miss Intercontinental:
Brenda Muñoz Hernández

Chica Cointreau Costa Rica:
Catalina Freer Castro

Miss Hispanomérica Internacional:
Paola Chacón Fuentes

Miss Supranational:
Monica Zamora Chavarría

Miss Latino Tourism:
Axa Valeria Pineda Madrigal
Monica Zamora Chavarría
Paola Chacón Fuentes

Miss International:
Paola Chacón Fuentes

Miss Universal Models:
Axa Valeria Pineda Madrigal

Reina Internacional del Trópico:
Amanda Agüero Peralta

Reinaldo Del Cafe:
Brenda Muñoz Hernández

Queen of Costa Rica International:
Paola Chacón Fuentes

References 

2019 beauty pageants
Beauty pageants in Costa Rica